Dreeshen is a surname. Notable people with the surname include:

Devin Dreeshen (born 1987/88), Canadian politician
Earl Dreeshen (born 1953), Canadian politician

See also
Dreesen